General Sir Charles Richard Huxtable,  (22 July 1931 – 26 November 2018) was a senior British Army officer who served as Commander-in-Chief, Land Forces from 1988 to 1990.

Military career
Huxtable graduated from the Royal Military Academy Sandhurst and was commissioned a second lieutenant in the Duke of Wellington's Regiment on 8 February 1952. He was given the service number 420858. He served as a platoon commander in the latter stages of the Korean War. He was promoted to lieutenant on 8 February 1954, captain on 8 February 1958, was appointed a Member of the Order of the British Empire in the 1961 Queen's Birthday Honours, and made major on 8 February 1965. In 1967 he served as a Company Commander in Cyprus.

Huxtable became Commander of Land Forces in Northern Ireland in 1980, Director of Army Staff Duties in 1982, and then Commander of Training and Arms Directors at the Ministry of Defence in 1983. He went on to be Quartermaster-General in 1986 and Commander-in-Chief, Land Forces in 1988 before retiring in 1990.

Huxtable held the colonelcy of the Duke of Wellington's Regiment from 1982 to 1990 and was Colonel Commandant of the Ulster Defence Regiment from 1991 until 1992. He then served as the first Colonel of the Royal Irish Regiment from 1992 to 1996.

Later life
In retirement Huxtable served as a member of the Prime Minister's Advisory Committee on Business Appointments. He died on 26 November 2018.

References

External links
 Duke of Wellington's Regimental Website – Who We Are, by General Huxtable

 

|-
 

2018 deaths
1931 births
British Army generals
British military personnel of the Cyprus Emergency
Knights Commander of the Order of the Bath
People educated at Wellington College, Berkshire
Duke of Wellington's Regiment officers
British Army personnel of the Korean War
British military personnel of The Troubles (Northern Ireland)
Commanders of the Order of the British Empire
Deputy Lieutenants of North Yorkshire